Sycamore Cottage is a historic home located at Cambridge, Dorchester County, Maryland, United States. It was built possibly as early as 1765. The house is a -story gambrel-roofed frame structure. Remodelings during the 19th century include adding Victorian windows, a central Colonial Revival entrance porch, 1840s Greek Revival interior decorative detailing, and the addition of a large one-story meeting hall. It was moved to this location in 1840. Since 1922, Sycamore Cottage has been the headquarters of the Cambridge Woman's Club.

Sycamore Cottage was listed on the National Register of Historic Places in 1988.

References

External links
, including photo from 1987, at Maryland Historical Trust

Houses in Dorchester County, Maryland
Houses on the National Register of Historic Places in Maryland
Houses completed in 1765
Greek Revival houses in Maryland
Cambridge, Maryland
National Register of Historic Places in Dorchester County, Maryland